Gourretiidae is a family of crustaceans belonging to the infraorder Axiidea, within the order Decapoda.

Genera
Gourretia de Saint Laurent, 1973
Heterogourretia Sakai, 2017
Ivorygourretia Sakai, 2017
Laurentgourretia Sakai, 2004
Plantesgourretia Sakai, 2017
Ruiyuliugourretia Sakai, 2017
Tuerkaygourretia Sakai, 2017

References

Decapods
Decapod families